Roger Maes (4 July 1943 – 13 March 2021) was a Belgian volleyball player. He competed in the men's tournament at the 1968 Summer Olympics. He played at four world championships. For the Belgian national team he played more than 200 international matches. Maes became four times Belgian volleyball player of the year (1971, 1972, 1974, 1979). He also worked as a firefighter.

References

External links

1943 births
2021 deaths
Belgian men's volleyball players
Olympic volleyball players of Belgium
Volleyball players at the 1968 Summer Olympics
Sportspeople from Ghent
Deaths from the COVID-19 pandemic in Belgium